Hiroshi Negishi (ねぎし ひろし, born June 20, 1960) is a Japanese anime director who got his start at Toei Animation, then join Tatsunoko Production and AIC and later became one of the founders of anime studios Zero-G Room (in 1991) and Radix (in 1995). Both studios would merge operations in 2001. In 2011, he founded anime studio Zero-G. He's also the CEO of Saber Project.

Filmography
 Ladius (1987)
 Sonic Soldier Borgman (1988)
 Sonic Soldier Borgman: Last Battle (1989)
 NG Knight Ramune & 40 (1990)
 Judge (1991)
 Tekkaman Blade (1992)
 K.O. Beast (1992)
 Suikoden Demon Century (1993)
 Bounty Dog (1994)
 Tenchi Muyo! (1995)
 Burn-Up W (1996)
 Shadow Skill (1996)
 Tenchi Muyou! in Love (1996)
 VS Knight Ramune & 40 Fire (1996)
 Master of Mosquiton (1996)
 Saber Marionette J (1996)
 Master of Mosquiton 99 (1997)
 Tenchi Muyo Movie 3: Tenchi Forever (1999)
 Amazing Nurse Nanako (1999)
 Baby Felix (2000)
 Dennō Bōkenki Webdiver (2001)
 Shiawase Sou no Okojo-san (2001)
 Divergence Eve (2003)
 Vie Durant (2003)
 Divergence Eve: Misaki Chronicles (2004)
 Wind: A Breath of Heart (2004)
 Akahori Gedō Hour Rabuge (2005)
 Cream Lemon New Generation (2006)
 Bakegyamon (2006)
 Paboo & Mojies (2012)
 Ai Tenchi Muyo! (2014)
 Jewelpet Attack Travel! (2022)

References

External links
 
 Hiroshi Negishi anime works at Media Arts Database 

1960 births
Anime directors
Living people
Tatsunoko Production people